William Campyon  was Dean of Ferns from 1590 to 1591.

Notes

16th-century Irish Anglican priests
Deans of Ferns